William Snawsell (1415-1493/94) was a goldsmith and Mayor of York, who represented York in the 1470-71 Parliament.

Snawsell was the son of William Snawsell, a goldsmith, and became a freeman of York in 1436, when he reached his majority. He married Jane Thweng, daughter of John Thweng of Heworth, and practiced as a goldsmith and coiner. At some point he was master of the mint at York.

He became Chamberlain of the city in 1459, sheriff in 1464–65, Mayor and Alderman in 1468. When the Lancastrian parliament was summoned in October 1470 following Henry VI's return to power, Snowsill was named one of the burgesses for the town. In 1471, he was given a general pardon along with other members of the Parliament. This was the fourth pardon he had received since 1458.

He appears to have remained an alderman of the city; in 1476 he was fined for withdrawing from Council, and in 1492 he resigned his place due to impoverishment and illness. He died at some point between September 1493 and January 1495.

References

1415 births
1490s deaths
English MPs 1470
People from York
English goldsmiths